Konduru is a village in NTR district of the Indian state of Andhra Pradesh. It is located in Nandigama mandal of Vijayawada revenue division. It is a part of Andhra Pradesh Capital Region.

References 

Villages in NTR district
Mandal headquarters in NTR district
Villages in Andhra Pradesh Capital Region